Stephen Owens is an American politician and businessman serving as a member of the Kansas House of Representatives from the 74th district. Elected in November 2018, he assumed office in January 2019.

Education 
Owens earned a Bachelor of Science degree in business and accounting from Bethel College and a Master of Business Administration from Southwestern College.

Career 
From 1997 to 2015, Owens served as a captain in the Hesston, Kansas, Fire Department. From 2000 to 2003, he also worked as a CPA. From 2014 to 2018, Owens was the vice president of the Kansas Bail Bonds Association. He co-founded Axis Monitoring LLC, a company that provides alcohol, GPS and house arrest monitoring services. Owens also owns a bail bonds company with locations in Wichita and Emporia. He was elected to the Kansas House of Representatives in November 2018 and assumed office in January 2019.

References 

Living people
Bethel College (Kansas) alumni
Southwestern College (Kansas) alumni
Republican Party members of the Kansas House of Representatives
Year of birth missing (living people)
21st-century American politicians